Until the Light Takes Us is a 2008 American documentary film about early Norwegian black metal, directed by Aaron Aites and Audrey Ewell. The film premiered at the AFI Film Festival in 2008, a year before it was released in theaters.

Featured interviewees 
 Gylve "Fenriz" Nagell (Darkthrone)
 Varg "Count Grishnackh" Vikernes (Burzum, Mayhem)
 Jan Axel "Hellhammer" Blomberg (Mayhem)
 Olve "Abbath" Eikemo (Immortal)
 Harald "Demonaz" Nævdal (Immortal)
 Bjarne Melgaard (visual artist)
 Kristoffer "Garm" Rygg (Ulver, Arcturus)
 Kjetil "Frost" Haraldstad (Satyricon, 1349, Keep of Kalessin)
 Bård "Faust" Eithun (Emperor) – Eithun chose to appear as a silhouette, with his voice distorted
Archives footage 
 Øystein "Euronymous" Aarseth (died in 1993) (Mayhem)
 Per "Dead" Ohlin (died in 1991) (Mayhem)
 Snorre "Blackthorn" Ruch (Thorns, Mayhem)

Release 
Variance Films acquired the theatrical rights to the film in the U.S. and released it in New York City on December 4, 2009. The film grossed $7,246 on a single screen in its first week, the second highest per-screen gross of any debuting film at the time (behind Up in the Air).

Reception 
Until the Light Takes Us received a 54 out of 100 score on Metacritic and a 46% approval rating on Rotten Tomatoes.

Andrew O'Hehir of Salon.com called the film "crafty and compelling". Nick Pinkerton of The Village Voice wrote, "The filmmakers seem cowed into obeisance by their subjects. Varg's last onscreen appearance is accompanied by a montage fitting a schoolyard crush, and the film's title is the translation of Burzum's fourth album, Hvis lyset tar oss. [...] [the film] arrives a decade too late to add much."

See also
 Lords of Chaos: The Bloody Rise of the Satanic Metal Underground brings into focus the church burning and murders that occurred around 1993. 
 Lords of Chaos, a dramatization of some events in the Norwegian black metal scene.

References

External links

2008 documentary films
2008 films
American independent films
Black metal
Documentary films about heavy metal music and musicians
Variance Films films
2008 independent films
2000s English-language films
2000s American films
American documentary films